, also known mononymously as Yukika, is a Japanese singer and actress based in South Korea. She is also a former model and voice actress.

After successfully auditioning for Nicola in 2006, Teramoto modeled exclusively for the magazine until 2009. In 2007, she made her acting debut in the live-action drama adaptation of ChocoMimi. From 2009 to 2012, she provided voice acting for several anime and video game series, most notably Rouge Clafoutis from Dog Days, Chiri Nakazato from Seitokai Yakuindomo, and Kaname Nonomiya from Gal Gun.

After taking a hiatus in 2012 to focus on her university studies, Teramoto returned to entertainment in 2015. In 2016, Teramoto starred in the South Korean drama The Idolmaster KR and debuted in the tie-in Korean idol girl group Real Girls Project, jumpstarting her career in South Korea. In 2019, she released her first Korean solo single, "Neon". She released her debut album, Soul Lady, in July 2020.

Career

2006–2009: Modeling and acting debut 
In 2006, Teramoto was one of the Grand Prix winners in the 10th model auditions for pre-teen fashion magazine Nicola out of 5,986 applicants. She began working as an exclusive model for Nicola beginning in the September 2006 issue until March 2009 issue. She made her acting debut in the live-action adaptation of ChocoMimi in 2007. In addition to playing the lead character Choco, Teramoto also released music as her character along with Kayano Masuyama under the name Choco & Mimi. Their first single, "Happy Happy!", was released in 2008 as the opening theme song to ChocoMimi and reached #175 on the Oricon Weekly Singles Chart.

In 2008, Teramoto made her film debut with a minor role in Handsome Suits. She also appeared in commercials for Pocari Sweat from Otsuka Pharmaceutical, Baskin Robbins, and Bandai Namco Entertainment's Happy Dance Collection for the Nintendo Wii.

2009–2012: Voice acting career and hiatus 

After graduating as a model from Nicola, Teramoto enrolled in the agency I'm Enterprise as a voice actress and debuted with a minor role in K-On! She began attending the voice acting school NichiNare. Aside from providing additional voices in various anime and video game series, Teramoto also had a recurring role on Dog Days as Rouge Clafoutis, Seitokai Yakuindomo as Chiri Nakazato, and Gal Gun as Kaname Nonomiya. In 2012, Teramoto went on hiatus to attend university, resigning from I'm Enterprise on December 28, 2011.

2015–present: Real Girls Project and solo music debut

Teramoto returned to the entertainment industry in August 2015 and appeared in commercials and stage plays. She stated she had been interested in South Korean culture since listening to "Gee" by Girls' Generation. She also grew up listening to Korean artists such as Girls' Generation, Kara, and BoA. In 2016, she auditioned for The Idolmaster KR, a South Korean drama adaptation of the original game series. She was the only Japanese cast member to be selected. Aside from playing a fictionalized version of herself in The Idolmaster KR, Teramoto was also part of the Real Girls Project, a Korean idol group formed for the drama. Teramoto was also a contestant on the reality show Mix Nine along with other members of Real Girls Project; she finished in 34th place.

After Real Girls Project disbanded, Teramoto left Mole Entertainment and signed with Estimate Entertainment. In 2018, Teramoto was cast as Yui, a supporting role for the South Korean web drama Hello, Stranger! She provided the voice to Athena and Palas in the mobile game Destiny Child; she also provided a new version of the game's theme song, "Da yo ne Da yo ne."

On February 22, 2019, Teramoto released her debut Korean solo single "Neon", which had a "new retro girl" concept based on the city pop genre. Later that year, her followup single "Cherries Jubiles" was released on July 9. In preparation for her first solo album, Soul Lady, Teramoto released "Yesterday" on July 8, 2020, as a pre-release track. Soul Lady was officially released on July 21, 2020, alongside its title track.

On November 30, 2020, Teramoto announced the termination of her contract with Estimate Entertainment. A month later, Teramoto signed with Ubuntu Entertainment, a new agency established by her former manager.

In February 2021, Ubuntu Entertainment announced that Teramoto will return with her first extended play sometime in the first half of 2021. A pre-release single, "Lovemonth", was released on March 2, for her upcoming extended play, titled Timeabout,. Timeabout, was released on April 7, 2021, along with the music video for the lead single off the EP, titled "Insomnia".

On September 20, 2021, Teramoto released the digital single "Loving You".
On September 29, Teramoto released her first Japanese original single "Tokyo Lights", a few months after debuting the Japanese version for "Insomnia".

On June 23, 2022, Teramoto released the digital single "Scent".

Personal life
On April 23, 2022, Ubuntu Entertainment announced that Teramoto will be getting married to a non-celebrity Korean boyfriend. On July 1, 2022, Teramoto revealed through YouTube that her husband is Kim Min-hyuk, a former member of the South Korean boy band MAP6)

Filmography

Live-action

Television

Films

Theater

Music video appearances

Voice acting

Anime

Films

OVA

Video games

Drama CDs

Radio

Discography

Studio albums

Extended plays

Singles

As lead artist

As featured artist

Promotional singles

Collaborations

Soundtrack appearances

Guest appearances

Music videos

Awards and nominations

Notes

References

External links
Agency profile

1993 births
21st-century Japanese actresses
Voice actresses from Shizuoka Prefecture
Musicians from Shizuoka Prefecture
Japanese expatriates in South Korea
Japanese female models
Japanese K-pop singers
Japanese-language singers
Japanese voice actresses
K-pop singers
Korean-language singers of Japan
Living people
Models from Shizuoka Prefecture
I'm Enterprise voice actors